Type 93 was a class of U-boats built during World War I by the Kaiserliche Marine.

Type 93 U-boats carried 16 torpedoes and had various arrangements of deck guns. As with the type 81 and 87, some had only one  SK L/30 deck gun while others had a single  SK L/45 gun and some were initially equipped with both. In 1917 some of the boats were refitted with a single 10.5 cm gun and 220 rounds.

Many arrangements from the Type 81, 87 and 93 were also seen on World War II Type IX U-boats when their design work took place 20 years later.

Compared to the previous type 87, the 93s were  longer, while the pressure hull was  longer. They were  faster on the surface, and unchanged at  submerged. They still carried 16 torpedoes with four bow and two stern tubes. Crew size was increased by 3 to 39.

Compared to the following type Large MS, the 93s were shorter, and  lighter. Their range was 980 nmi shorter, and speed was  slower on the surface but  faster submerged.  The Large MS was intended for the deepest waters and the increased size made it more comfortable and very seaworthy.

Type 93 boats were responsible for sinking 3.201% of all allied shipping sunk during the war, taking a total of 412,419 combined tons. They also damaged 71,202 combined tons.

List of Type 93 submarines 
There were 24 Type 93 submarines commissioned into the Kaiserliche Marine.

By the end of World War I, 375 U-boats of 33 separate classes belonging to 7 general types had been commissioned. More boats were finished after the war and either destroyed or awarded to victorious nations.

References

Bibliography

External links 

Submarine classes
World War I submarines of Germany
German Type U 93 submarines